The expression Chur S-Bahn is used to describe two S-Bahn-style regional rail services focused upon Chur, the capital of the canton of Graubünden, Switzerland.  Both of these S-Bahn services run on metre gauge lines, and are operated by the Rhaetian Railway, which also runs the line from Chur to Arosa in similar fashion.

History 
Upon the 2005 timetable change, the Chur – Landquart and Thusis – Chur regional lines on the Landquart–Thusis railway were converted into S-Bahn lines.  They were originally designated S8 and S9, respectively.  The former line was also extended at both ends, to Rhäzüns and Schiers.  Since 2009, the two lines have been designated S1 and S2, respectively.

Lines 
The following lines are the ones currently in service:

  Rhäzüns – Reichenau-Tamins – Chur West – Chur – Landquart – Schiers
  Thusis – Rhäzüns – Reichenau-Tamins – Chur
  Chur – Arosa

Each of the S-Bahn lines operates at hourly intervals. Where they overlap, between Rhäzüns and Chur, the service intervals are 20 minutes / 40 minutes.

Future 
There are proposals to add to the Chur S-Bahn network the Ziegelbrücke – Sargans – Landquart – Chur regional line, which is operated by the SBB-CFF-FFS, and also to shorten its service intervals to a train every thirty minutes. Additionally, this line is proposed to be extended to Ems Werk via SBB-CFF-FFS / RhB dual gauge track.

See also

Bernina Express
Glacier Express

References

External links

 Rhaetian Railway – official site 

S-Bahn in Switzerland
Rhaetian Railway